Moriusaq Heliport  is a heliport in Moriusaq, a village in Avannaata municipality in northern Greenland. The heliport is considered a helistop, and is served by Air Greenland as part of a government contract. The village population had dwindled to 2 by 2010, and thus operations at the heliport are likely to be discontinued at any time.

Airlines and destinations 

Air Greenland operates government contract flights to villages in the Qaanaaq area. These mostly cargo flights are not featured in the timetable, although they can be pre-booked. Departure times for these flights as specified during booking are by definition approximate, with the settlement service optimized on the fly depending on local demand for a given day.

Transfers at Thule Air Base 
Travellers bound for Thule Air Base in Pituffik are required to apply for an access permit from either Rigsombudsmanden in Nuuk (residents of Greenland) or the Danish Foreign Ministry (all others). Failure to present the permit during check-in results in denial of boarding. The same rules apply for transfers at Pituffik, including a stopover on the way from Moriusaq to Savissivik.

References

Airports in the Arctic
Heliports in Greenland